Hillary Clinton presidential campaign endorsements may refer to:

List of Hillary Clinton 2008 presidential campaign endorsements
List of Hillary Clinton 2016 presidential campaign endorsements (disambiguation)
List of Hillary Clinton 2016 presidential campaign non-political endorsements
List of Hillary Clinton 2016 presidential campaign political endorsements